Tocantins Futebol Clube, also known as Tocantins, are a Brazilian football team from Palmas, Tocantins. They competed in the Série D in 2009.

History
Tocantins Futebol Clube were founded on August 10, 1979. They won the Campeonato Tocantinense in 2008, beating Gurupi in the final. Tocantins competed in the Série D in 2009, when they were eliminated in the first stage.

Stadium
Tocantins play their home games at Nilton Santos. The stadium has a maximum capacity of 12,000 people.

Achievements

 Campeonato Tocantinense:
 Winners (1): 2008

References

 
Football clubs in Tocantins
Association football clubs established in 1979
1979 establishments in Brazil